The Chess Club and Scholastic Center of Atlanta (CCSCATL) is a chess venue located in Roswell, Georgia. It is administered by co-founder Ben Finegold, a chess grandmaster.

History
The CCSCATL was founded by Karen Boyd and her husband Ben Finegold. It officially opened on September 9, 2017. In December 2021, Kidchess acquired the Chess Center.

References

External links 
 
 Official YouTube channel

Chess clubs in the United States
Sports venues in Atlanta
Roswell, Georgia
2017 establishments in Georgia (U.S. state)